Ceracanthia pseudopeterseni is a species of snout moth. It was described by Herbert H. Neunzig and Maria Alma Solis in 2002 and is known from Costa Rica, Guatemala, and Peru.

References

Moths described in 2002
Phycitinae